Yawriwiri or Yawri Wiri (Aymara, Hispanicized spelling Yaurihuiri) is a mountain in the Wansu mountain range in the Andes of Peru, about  high. It is situated in the Apurímac Region, Antabamba Province, Antabamba District. Yawriwiri lies between Pumaranra in the east and Apachita in the west.

References 

Mountains of Peru
Mountains of Apurímac Region